Irpiciporus pachyodon is a species of fungus belonging to the family Polyporaceae.

It has cosmopolitan distribution.

Synonym:
 Spongipellis pachyodon

References

Polyporaceae